Kozue (written: 梢, こず恵 or こずえ in hiragana) is a feminine Japanese given name. Notable people with the name include:

, Japanese fashion model
, Japanese manga artist
, Japanese footballer
, Japanese anime producer
, Japanese male ice hockey player
, Japanese voice actress

Fictional characters
, a character in the manga series Mahoraba
, a character in the visual novel Yosuga no Sora
, a character in the manga series  Working!!
,a character in the anime series  Maison Ikkoku

Japanese feminine given names